Made Men is a 1999 film produced by HBO starring James Belushi, Michael Beach and Timothy Dalton. It combines elements of comedy with action and adventure.

Cast
 James Belushi as Bill Manucci
 Michael Beach as Miles
 Timothy Dalton as Sheriff Dex Drier
 Steve Railsback as Kyle
 Carlton Wilborn as Felix
 Vanessa Angel as Debra
 Jamie Harris as Royce
 David O'Donnell as Nick
 Tim Kelleher as Deputy Conley
 Don Shanks as Caleb
 Conrad Goode as Jessop

External links

1999 films
1999 comedy films
Films scored by Stewart Copeland
Films produced by Joel Silver
Films directed by Louis Morneau
1990s English-language films